The 1998–99 Southern Football League season was the 96th in the history of the league, an English football competition.

Nuneaton Borough won the Premier Division and earned promotion to the Football Conference. Hastings Town, Gresley Rovers and Bromsgrove Rovers were relegated from the Premier Division, whilst Havant & Waterlooville, Clevedon Town, Margate and Newport County were promoted from the Southern and Midland Divisions, the former two as champions. Bloxwich Town and Brackley Town were relegated to the eighth level whilst Andover resigned from the league.

At the end of the season Midland Division was renamed Western Division, and Southern Division was renamed Eastern Division.

Premier Division
The Premier Division consisted of 22 clubs, including 18 clubs from the previous season and four new clubs:
Two clubs promoted from the Midland Division:
Grantham Town
Ilkeston Town

Plus:
Boston United, transferred from the Northern Premier League
Weymouth, promoted from the Southern Division

League table

Midland Division
The Midland Division consisted of 22 clubs, including 16 clubs from the previous season and six new clubs:
Four clubs transferred from the Southern Division:
Cinderford Town
Clevedon Town
Newport
Weston-super-Mare

Plus:
Bloxwich Town, promoted from the Midland Alliance
Stamford, promoted from the United Counties League

At the end of the season Midland Division was renamed Western Division.

League table

Southern Division
The Southern Division consisted of 22 clubs, including 13 clubs from the previous season and nine new clubs, relegated from the Premier Division:
Three clubs relegated from the Premier Division:
Ashford Town (Kent)
Sittingbourne
St. Leonards Stamcroft, who also changed name to St. Leonards.

Three clubs transferred from the Midland Division:
Brackley Town
Corby Town
Raunds Town

Plus:
Andover, promoted from the Wessex League
Folkestone Invicta, promoted from the Kent League
Havant & Waterlooville, new club formed as a merger of Havant Town and Waterlooville

At the end of the season Southern Division was renamed Eastern Division.

League table

Cup competition
The league's cup competition, the Dr Martens League Cup, was won by Cambridge City who beat Sutton Coldfield Town 2–1 on aggregate in the final. The first round, semi-finals and final were played over two legs with the second, third and fourth rounds going to a replay if the tie finished all square. Cambridge had beaten Dorchester Town 4–3 on aggregate to reach the final and Sutton Coldfield defeated Boston United 2–1 on aggregate to reach the final.

See also
Southern Football League
1998–99 Isthmian League
1998–99 Northern Premier League

References

Southern Football League seasons
6